The 1972–73 season was the 100th season of competitive football in Scotland and the 76th season of Scottish league football.

Scottish League Division One

Champions: Celtic 
Relegated: Kilmarnock, Airdrieonians

Scottish League Division Two

Promoted: Clyde, Dunfermline Athletic

Cup honours

 – second replay

Other honours

National

County

 – aggregate over two legs

Highland League

Individual honours

Scotland national team

1973 British Home Championship – Third Place

Key:
(H) = Home match
(A) = Away match
WCQG8 = World Cup qualifying – Group 8
BHC = British Home Championship

See also
1972–73 Rangers F.C. season

Notes and references

External links
Scottish Football Historical Archive

 
Seasons in Scottish football